Cerastium holosteoides, the common mouse-ear chickweed, is a species of flowering plant belonging to the family Caryophyllaceae.

Its native range is temperate and subarctic areas of the Old World; scattered countries in Africa, nearly all of Eurasia to New Guinea. One of the world's most widespread weeds, it has been introduced to most of North America, the western countries of South America, New Zealand, South Africa, and many islands around the world.

References

holosteoides
Flora of Europe
Flora of Asia
Plants described in 1817